Robert Henry Otley Gale (1878 – 26 July 1950) was the 18th mayor of Vancouver, British Columbia from 1918 to 1921. He was born in Quebec.

He became mayor after winning a massive victory over incumbent Malcolm McBeath by 3300 votes following a prohibition-related scandal.

References

External links
Vancouver History: list of mayors, accessed 20 August 2006

1878 births
1950 deaths
Mayors of Vancouver
Anglophone Quebec people
20th-century Canadian politicians